The Democratic Party (DP) was a political party in South Korea. Formerly named Millennium Democratic Party (MDP), it was renamed in May 6, 2005. After its dissolution, its members joined the Uri Party or the successor Democratic Party.

History 

In 2000, the party officially founded, after it merged of National Congress for New Politics and New People Party led by Lee In-je and a number of conservative minded politicians joined it. In the 2000 Parliamentary election the party came second winning 115 seats.

Roh Moo-hyun was elected as president in 2002, but he subsequently left the party after he inaugurated as president and his supporters formed the Uri Party in 2003.

The MDP lost majority when Roh was impeached in March 2004 by the National Assembly for illegal electioneering and incompetence charges with support from the Grand National Party, losing 53 seats to a total of only 9 seats in the 2004 parliamentary election. Roh Moo-hyun was later re-instated by the Constitutional Court, and served as president until the end of his term.

By June 2007, much of the party joined the Uri Party, while the New People faction merged the party with the Central Reform United New Party to form a new Democratic Party.

Political position 
The Democratic Party is a political party led by Kim Dae-jung individual charisma and is generally classified as "liberalism" or "conservative liberalism". Later in 2017, South Korea's centre-right conservative  politician Ha Tae-keung said of Kim Dae-jung, "He devoted his life to democracy and the market economy in Korea", adding, "He is a big adult in the conservative camp".

South Korean centrist conservative-liberal politician Sohn Hak-kyu said "the (Democratic Party of Korea's) DJ period was a complete 'centrist', but the Roh Moo-hyun government and the Moon Jae-in government were on the 'left-leaning' side". (For your information, "DJ" is an abbreviation for "Dae-jung".)

Kim Dae-jung and the Democratic Party enacted the 'Domestic Violence Prevention Act' and the 'Anti Male and Female Discrimination Act', and established the 'Ministry of Gender Equality". Also, Kim Dae-jung himself was a feminist. On the other hand, he pursued a typical conservative economic agenda and was called a "Neoliberal Revolutionist".

Presidential election primary

Candidates
This is a  list of official pre-registered candidates that declared their 2007 presidential bid.

 Kim Yeong-hwan(김영환), former Assembly member and also former Minister of Science and Technology of the Kim Dae-jung Administration has been declared not to run its presidential primary on August 31, 2007

Election results

President

Legislature

Local

See also
 List of political parties in South Korea
 Centrist reformism
 Politics of South Korea
 Elections in South Korea
 Liberalism in South Korea

Notes

References

External links
 Namuwiki - Democratic Party (2005) 
 Democratic Party official site

Democratic parties in South Korea
Defunct liberal political parties
Conservative liberal parties
Neoliberalism
Neoliberal parties
Defunct political parties in South Korea
Political parties established in 1995
Political parties disestablished in 2008
Kim Dae-jung
Roh Moo-hyun